A complete protein or whole protein is a food source of protein that contains an adequate proportion of each of the nine essential amino acids necessary in the human diet.

Amino acid profile 
The following table lists the optimal profile of the nine essential amino acids in the human diet, which comprises complete protein, as recommended by the US Institute of Medicine's Food and Nutrition Board. The foodstuffs listed for comparison show the essential amino acid content per unit of the total protein of the food, 100g of spinach, for example, only contains 2.9g of protein (6% Daily Value), and of that protein 1.36% is tryptophan.(note that the examples have not been corrected for digestibility)

Total adult daily intake 
The second column in the following table shows the amino acid requirements of adults as recommended by the World Health Organization calculated for a  adult.

See also
Protein quality
Protein Digestibility Corrected Amino Acid Score

References

Nutrition
Proteins as nutrients